Dubingiai is a town in Molėtai district in Lithuania. It is situated near Lake Asveja, the longest lake in the country. The town has 208 inhabitants as of 2017.

History

The settlement was first mentioned in 1334, when Teutonic knights razed terra Dubingam during one of their raids. Other raids took place in 1373 and 1375. During the reign of the Grand Duke of Lithuania Vytautas the Great the town became an important place in that part of Lithuania. In 1415 Vytautas ordered the building of a new masonry castle.

Later it was governed by the Radziwiłłs who built Dubingiai Castle from rock and town became one of the centres of the Reformation in Lithuania. Many famous members of Radziwiłł family were burned and are buried in the churchyard of Dubingiai castle. In the 17th century weave and paper manufactures were established in the town. In the 17th century - 18th century the town was slowly re-converted to Catholicism.

Within the Grand Duchy of Lithuania, Dubingiai belonged to Vilnius Voivodeship. It was annexed by the Russian Empire after the Third Partition of Poland in 1795 and became a part of Vilna Governorate.

A massacre of over 20 Lithuanian inhabitants by a local Home Army unit occurred on 23 June 1944, during World War II. The crime was a retaliation by the Polish commander for an earlier massacre of Polish villagers in Glitiškės by collaborationist Lithuanian police.

Gallery

References

External links

  Website of Dubingiai

Towns in Lithuania
Towns in Utena County
Vilnius Voivodeship
Vilensky Uyezd